Staraya Beryozovka is the name of several rural localities in Russia:
Staraya Beryozovka, Smolensk Oblast, a village in Roslavlsky District of Smolensk Oblast
Staraya Beryozovka, Tomsk Oblast, a selo in Kargasoksky District of Tomsk Oblast
Staraya Beryozovka, name of several other rural localities

See also
 Beryozovka (disambiguation)